The eighth season of Law & Order: Criminal Intent premiered on the USA Network in the United States on April 19, 2009. It consisted of sixteen episodes, and concluded on August 9, 2009. The day following each episode's broadcast on television, they are made available to purchase and download from the iTunes Store. Law & Order: Criminal Intent is an American police procedural television series set and filmed in New York City. It is the second spin-off of the long-running crime drama Law & Order, and was created by Dick Wolf and René Balcer. Law & Order: Criminal Intent follows the New York City Police Department's Major Case Squad, which investigates high-profile murder cases.

Season eight starred Vincent D'Onofrio as Detective Robert Goren, Kathryn Erbe as Detective Alexandra Eames, Julianne Nicholson as Detective Megan Wheeler, and Eric Bogosian as Captain Danny Ross. Jeff Goldblum joined the cast as Detective Zack Nichols. The season was executive produced by the following teams:  Walon Green and Michael Chernuchin; Ed Zuckerman and Tim Lea; Dick Wolf and Peter Jankowski; and Norberto Barba, Diana Son, Julie Martin, and Arthur W. Forney.

Production 
Law & Order: Criminal Intent is the third series in the crime drama Law & Order franchise, which was created by Dick Wolf in 1990. It  was developed by Wolf and René Balcer, who began working on the original Law & Order series during its first season. Law & Order: Criminal Intent is a police procedural crime drama that follows a distinct division of the New York City Police Department: the Major Case Squad, and its investigations into high-profile murder cases, such as those involving VIPs, local government officials and employees, the financial industry, and the art world. Unlike the other series in the Law & Order franchise, Law & Order: Criminal Intent gives significant attention to the actions and motives of the criminals, rather than primarily focusing on the police investigation and trial prosecution. Episodes do not usually contain trials, and often end in confessions rather than plea bargains or verdicts.

USA Network made a sixteen-episode order for season eight on May 22, 2008, down from the twenty-two episodes of season seven. Production for season eight began at the end of the summer of 2008, shooting on location in and around New York City using local color. The main set of One Police Plaza is located at Pier 62, Chelsea Piers, Manhattan. 

Following the departure of Warren Leight, who served as show runner, executive producer, and head writer in seasons six and seven, it was announced in July 2008 that Walon Green and Robert Nathan would share Leight's role for the forthcoming eighth season, handling eight episodes each; however, after making two episodes, Nathan was replaced by Law & Order executive producer Ed Zuckerman. Michael Chernuchin co-executive produces Green's episodes, and Tim Lea co-executive produces Zuckerman's episodes. Wolf and Peter Jankowski are also credited as executive producers, as with all other Law & Order series. Other executive producers on the series are Norberto Barba, Diana Son, Julie Martin, and Arthur W. Forney. Charlie Rubin is credited as the supervising producer, and Balcer, Eric Overmyer, and Siobhan Byrne O'Connor are consulting producers.

Cast 

Law & Order: Criminal Intent does not have an ensemble cast, and therefore differs from Law & Order and Law & Order: Special Victims Unit, which feature six and eight actors, respectively, receiving star billing in their seasons which are aired during the same 2008–2009 television season. The eighth season of Law & Order: Criminal Intent has five actors in starring roles, but only three appear on screen during an episode: two lead detectives and the Captain.

Four of the lead actors from the seventh season returned for season eight. Vincent D'Onofrio plays Detective Robert Goren, a hyper-intuitive contemporary Sherlock Holmes-type investigator who used to work for the US Military Police. Goren's partner, former vice squad detective, Alexandra Eames, is played by Kathryn Erbe. Eric Bogosian appears as Captain Danny Ross, and Julianne Nicholson continues to appear as Detective Megan Wheeler. Jeff Goldblum joins the cast as Detective Zack Nichols, replacing Detective Mike Logan (Chris Noth) as Wheeler's partner. Each episode features an alternate investigating team of detectives. D'Onofrio and Erbe appear together in one episode, and Goldblum and Nicholson appear together in the following episode. D'Onofrio and Erbe are in the third episode, and the fourth features Goldblum and Nicholson. Bogosian appears in every episode of the season. This format will continue until episode twelve, when Nicholson will leave the series temporarily on maternity leave. Erbe's character will then partner with both Goren and Nichols for the final four episodes of the season.

In a recurring role, Leslie Hendrix continues to appear as Assistant Chief Medical Examiner Elizabeth Rodgers, the same character she has also played in Law & Order and the first season of Law & Order: Special Victims Unit. She has appeared in all episodes of seasons 7 and 8. Steve Zirnkilton provides a voice-over at the beginning of each episode's opening credits, saying "In New York City's war on crime, the worst criminal offenders are pursued by the detectives of the Major Case Squad. These are their stories."

Distribution 
Season eight of  Law & Order: Criminal Intent first aired during the 2008–2009 television season on  USA Network, an American cable channel. The season premiere episode's air date changed twice before it was eventually broadcast on April 19, 2009, at 9:00 p.m. EST.  It was originally scheduled to air in November 2008, just three months after season seven's final episode, but was then pushed back to January 2009. It was rescheduled a second time in January. It was reported that the episodes were held back because the two starring Goldblum and Nicholson, and produced by Nathan were "terrible" and had to be scrapped. Episodes aired weekly – except May 24 – for sixteen weeks until August 9, 2009.

When Law & Order: Criminal Intent first premiered in 2001, it aired on NBC, the same broadcast network that the rest of the Law & Order franchise airs on. Under a $100,000-per-episode shared or second window syndication agreement made between NBC and USA Network, USA Network was allowed to broadcast episodes out of primetime a week after their premiere on NBC. In 2007, following a ratings decline, first-run episodes moved from NBC to USA Network, and NBC reaired the episodes beginning January 2008. The same deal continues to run for season eight; NBC began airing episodes from June 3, 2009.

The day following its broadcast on US television, each episode was available to purchase and download at the iTunes Store and Amazon Video on Demand; however, unlike most other NBC and USA Network series, they were not streamed on USA Network's website or Hulu, which was co-owned by NBC Universal, USA Network's parent company.

Reception 
Critical interest in season eight focused on the arrival of Jeff Goldblum as Detective Zack Nichols. Ginia Bellafante of The New York Times wrote, "[Nichols] is better suited to Mr. Goldblum's sensibility than the hallucinating detective he played on the short-lived series Raines, on which he was required to do too much feeling." She continued, "Goldblum’s initial scene has the effect of a star’s first walk-on in a stage play:  you feel moved to applause... you trust him to break  through the show’s melodramatic solemnity; he signals a kind of first-aid relief." She went on to say that Nicholson, as Detective Wheeler, Nichols' partner, "is destined to fade even further into the background than she did with her previous partner, Mike Logan," and that D'Onofrio's Detective Goren will now seem even more annoying when compared to Nichols. Brian Lowry, reviewing for Variety, echoed Bellafonte, commenting that "Goldblum's deft touch with rapid-fire delivery makes him a particularly good choice for the show's cerebral brand of crime drama, although as a consequence, that approach tends to leave the secondary detective with even less to occupy her in most episodes than the flagship [Law & Order]'s assistant district attorneys." He added that the addition of Goldblum to the cast "should breathe a bit of life into Law & Order: Criminal Intents familiar cat-and-mouse format," noting that it is the least consistently interesting series of the franchise. He noted, though, that due to the nature of the series, attention to the main characters' lives takes a back seat to the perpetrators, victims, and their investigations, saying it is a shame for Goldblum's admirers, as he is limited by the series' "fairly rigid parameters" and cannot fully showcase his acting talents. Lowry did, however, warn Goldblum's fans to "be content. Be very content." In Entertainment Weekly, Mandi Bierly said of Nichols, "he's so laidback that he often does not even appear to be moving when he's walking... He's exactly what you thought you were getting from the casting of Jeff Goldblum." Of Wheeler, she said she hoped that in the forthcoming episodes, Nicholson would get to do more with the character than she did in Goldblum's premiere episode. "I'm assuming she's not always that irrelevant?" she questioned. "She was just feeling her new partner out, which is why she did nothing?"

"Playing Dead," the season's first episode featuring Detectives Goren and Eames, had 4.578 million viewers, over 400,000 more viewers than the following episode, which was Goldblum's premiere. For the remainder of the season, however, episodes featuring Goldblum and Nicholson were watched by more viewers than the episodes featuring D'Onofrio and Erbe, although the viewing figures for all episodes continued to drop over the following weeks. The May 10 episode was watched by 3.14 million viewers and placed outside the top twenty cable network television shows for the week, although eight programs that did place inside the top twenty were NBA Playoff matches. Subsequent episodes were watched by 3.709 million viewers and 4.012 million viewers, but the June 7 episode saw the figures begin to climb. "The Glory That Was...," which aired on June 14, was the second-highest-rated cable television program for that night. It was watched by 4.14 million people from a total of 3.19 million households, and was watched by 1.87 million people within the 25- to 54-year-old demographics. Its viewing figures were beaten only by an episode of In Plain Sight, which was broadcast immediately after Law & Order: Criminal Intent on the USA Network. It was also the most-watched episode of the season that features Goldblum and Nicholson. The following week's episode, "Family Values," also received high viewing figures. Beaten out by In Plain Sight again, it was that night's second-highest-rated cable program among 25- to 54-year-olds, 1.625 million of whom viewed it. It was also the second-highest-rated program for total viewing figures, being watched by 3.44 million people.

Episodes

{| class="wikitable plainrowheaders" style="width:100%"
|- style="color:black"
! style="background:#878161;"|No. inseries
! style="background:#878161;"|No. inseason
! style="background:#878161;"|Title
! style="background:#878161;"|Directed by
! style="background:#878161;"|Written by
! style="background:#878161; width:120px"| air date
! style="background:#878161; width:135px"|NBC air date
! style="background:#878161;"|
! style="background:#878161;"|U.S. viewers(millions)

|}

References

Law & Order: Criminal Intent episodes
2009 American television seasons